Daring Danger is a 1922 American silent Western film directed by Clifford Smith and starring Pete Morrison, Esther Ralston and Lew Meehan.

Cast
 Pete Morrison as Cal Horton
 Esther Ralston as Ethel Stanton
 William Ryno as Bill Stanton 
 Lew Meehan as Steve Harris
 Bob Fleming as Bull Weaver

References

Bibliography
 Connelly, Robert B. The Silents: Silent Feature Films, 1910-36, Volume 40, Issue 2. December Press, 1998.
 Munden, Kenneth White. The American Film Institute Catalog of Motion Pictures Produced in the United States, Part 1. University of California Press, 1997.

External links
 

1922 films
1922 Western (genre) films
1920s English-language films
American silent feature films
Silent American Western (genre) films
Films directed by Clifford Smith
American black-and-white films
1920s American films